Rakovnica is a village and municipality in the Rožňava District in the Košice Region of middle-eastern Slovakia.

History
In historical records the village was first mentioned in 1327.

Geography
The village lies at an altitude of 358 metres and covers an area of 7.109 km².
It has a population of about 585 people.

Culture
The village has a public library and a football pitch.

External links
http://www.statistics.sk/mosmis/eng/run.html

Villages and municipalities in Rožňava District